The following is a list of awards and nominations received by American rapper Snoop Dogg.

American Music Awards
The American Music Awards is an annual awards ceremony created by Dick Clark in 1973 and one of several annual major American music awards shows (among the others are the Grammy Awards, the MTV Video Music Awards etc.). Snoop Dogg has won the award once.

|-
| rowspan="1" style="text-align:center;"|1995
| rowspan="1" style="text-align:left;"|Snoop Dogg
| Favorite Rap/Hip-Hop Artist
|
|-

APRA Music Awards
APRA Awards are award ceremonies run in Australia and New Zealand by Australasian Performing Right Association to recognise songwriting skills, sales and airplay performance by its members annually. Snoop Dogg has won the award once.

|-
| style="text-align:center;"|2011
| "California Gurls" (with Katy Perry)
|International Work of the Year
| 
|-
|}

AVN Awards
The "AVN Awards" are movie awards sponsored and presented by the American adult video industry trade magazine AVN (Adult Video News) to honor exceptional performance in various aspects of the creation and marketing of American pornographic movies. They are called the "Oscars of porn". Snoop Dogg has won the award twice.

|-
| 2002
|"Snoop Dogg's Doggystyle"
|rowspan="2"| Best Selling Title of the Year
| 
|-
| 2004
|"Snoop Dogg's Hustlaz: Diary of a Pimp"
| 
|-
|}

BET Awards
The BET Awards were established in 2001 by the Black Entertainment Television network to celebrate African Americans and other minorities in music, acting, sports, and other fields of entertainment over the past year. Snoop Dogg has received one award from seven nominations.

|-
|2001
| "The Next Episode" (with Dr. Dre & Nate Dogg)
| Video of the Year
|
|-
|rowspan="2"|2003
| "Snoop Dogg"
| Best Male Hip-Hop Artist 
|
|-
|"Beautiful" (featuring Pharrell & Charlie Wilson)
| Best Collaboration 
|
|-
|rowspan="2"|2005
| "Snoop Dogg"
| Best Male Hip-Hop Artist
|
|-
|"Drop It Like It's Hot" (featuring Pharrell)
| Best Collaboration
|
|-
|2008
| "Snoop Dogg"
| Best Male Hip Hop Artist
|
|-
|}

BET Hip Hop Awards
The BET Hip Hop Awards are hosted annually by BET for hip hop performers, producers, and music video directors. Snoop Dogg has been nominated once.

|-
|2008
| "Sexual Eruption"
| Best Hip Hop Video
|
|-
|}

Billboard Music Awards
The Billboard Music Awards are sponsored by Billboard magazine and is held annually in December. The awards are based on sales data by Nielsen SoundScan and radio information by Nielsen Broadcast Data Systems. Snoop Dogg has been nominated twice.

|-
|rowspan="2"|2005
|rowspan="2"|"Drop It Like It's Hot" (featuring Pharrell)
| Rap Song of the Year
|
|-
| Ringtone of the Year
|
|-
|}

Billboard R&B/Hip-Hop Awards
The Billboard R&B/Hip-Hop Awards reflect the performance of recordings on the Hot R&B/Hip-Hop Songs and Hot Rap Tracks. Snoop Dogg has won the award once from three nominations.

|-
|rowspan="3"|2005
|rowspan="3"|"Drop It Like It's Hot" (featuring Pharrell)
|Hot Rap Track
|
|-
|Top R&B/Hip-hop Singles - Airplay
|
|-
|Top R&B/Hip-hop Singles
|
|}

Black Reel Awards
The "Black Reel Awards" began in 2000 and were designed to annually recognize and celebrate the achievements of black people in feature, independent and television films. Snoop Dogg has been nominated twice.

|-
|2002
|"Just a Baby Boy" (featuring Tyrese & Mr. Tan)
|rowspan="2"|Best Original or Adapted Song
| 
|-
|2003
|"Undercova Funk (Give Up the Funk)" (featuring Bootsy Collins)
| 
|-
|}

California Music Awards
The "California Music Awards" is a music and entertainment ceremony founded by BAM (magazine). The publication predominantly features R&B and hip-hop music artists. Snoop Dogg has been nominated once.

|-
| rowspan="4" style="text-align:center;"|2003
|-
|Paid tha Cost to Be da Boss
| Outstanding Hip-Hop Album
|
|-
|}

Capricho Awards
Capricho Awards is a Brazilian award granted every year by the "Capricho" Magazine, Since 2001. Snoop Dogg has been nominated once.

|-
|2010
| "California Gurls" (with Katy Perry)
| International Song
| 
|-
|}

Echo Awards
The "Echo Awards" an association of recording companies of Germany to recognize outstanding achievement in the music industry. Snoop Dogg has been nominated once.

|-
| rowspan="4" style="text-align:center;"|2005
|-
|R&G (Rhythm & Gangsta): The Masterpiece
| International Hip-Hop/R&B Artist
|
|-
|}

Grammy Awards
The Grammy Awards are awarded annually by the National Academy of Recording Arts and Sciences of the United States for outstanding achievements in the music industry. Considered the highest music honor, the awards were established in 1958. Snoop Dogg holds the runner up record for most Grammy nominations without a win, with 17, tied with Chris Gehringer.

|-
|1994
|"Nuthin' but a 'G' Thang" (with Dr. Dre)
|Best Rap Performance by a Duo or Group
|
|-
|1995
|"Gin and Juice"
|Best Rap Solo Performance
|
|-
|1996
|"What Would You Do" (with Tha Dogg Pound)
|rowspan="3"|Best Rap Performance by a Duo or Group
|
|-
|2000
|"Still D.R.E." (with Dr. Dre)
|
|-
|2001
|"The Next Episode" (with Dr. Dre)
|
|-
|rowspan="2"|2004
|rowspan="2"|"Beautiful" (featuring Pharrell & Charlie Wilson)
|Best Rap Song
|
|-
|Best Rap/Sung Collaboration
|
|-
|rowspan="2"|2005
|rowspan="2"|"Drop It Like It's Hot" (featuring Pharrell)
|Best Rap Performance by a Duo or Group
|
|-
|Best Rap Song
|
|-
|2006
|"I Wanna Love You" (with Akon)
|Best Rap Sung/Collaboration
|
|-
|rowspan="2"|2009
|rowspan="2"|"Sexual Eruption"
|Best Rap Solo Performance
|
|-
|Best Rap Song
|
|- 
|rowspan="2"|2011
|Teenage Dream (as featured artist)
|Album of the Year
|
|-
|"California Gurls" (with Katy Perry)
|Best Pop Collaboration with Vocals
|
|-
|2013
|"Young, Wild & Free" (with Wiz Khalifa featuring Bruno Mars)
|Best Rap Song
|
|-
|2014
|Reincarnated
|Best Reggae Album
|
|-
|2016
|To Pimp a Butterfly (as featured artist)
|Album of the Year
|

Hollywood Walk of Fame

|-
|2018
|Snoop Dogg
|Hollywood Walk of Fame
|
|}

International Dance Music Awards
The International Dance Music Awards are an awards show for the dance and electronic music industry. Snoop Dogg has won the award once.

|-
|2005
|"Drop It Like It's Hot" (featuring Pharrell)
|Best Rap/Hip-Hop Dance Track
|
|-
|}

MOBO Awards
The MOBO Awards (an acronym for "Music of Black Origin") were established in 1996 by Kanya King. They are held annually in the United Kingdom to recognize artists of any race or nationality performing music of black origin. Snoop Dogg has won the award once from three nominations.

|-
|rowspan="2"|2005
|rowspan="2"|"Drop It Like It's Hot" (featuring Pharrell)
|Best Single
|
|-
|Best Video
|
|-
|2011
||Snoop Dogg
|Best International Act
|
|-
|}

MTV Movie Awards
The MTV Movie Awards were established in 1992 and is a film awards show presented annually on MTV. Snoop Dogg has won the award once.

|-
|2002
|Training Day
|Best Cameo
|
|-
|}

MTV Awards

MTV Video Music Awards
The MTV Video Music Awards were established in 1984 by MTV to celebrate the top music videos of the year. Snoop Dogg has won the award twice from eight nominations.

|-
|1994
|"Doggy Dogg World"
|rowspan="2"|Best Rap Video
|
|-
|2001
|"Lay Low"
|
|-
|2003
|"Beautiful"
|rowspan="2"|Best Hip-Hop Video
|
|-
|rowspan="3"|2005
|rowspan="3"|"Drop It Like It's Hot" (featuring Pharrell)
|
|-
|Viewer's Choice
|
|-
|Video of the Year
|
|-
|2013
|"No Guns Allowed" (featuring Drake & Cori B.)
|Best Video with a Social Message
|
|-
|2015
|"So Many Pros"
|Best Art Direction
|
|}

MTV Australia Awards
The MTV Australia Awards were established in 2005 and is Australia's first awards show to celebrate both local and international acts. Snoop Dogg has won the award twice from three nominations.

|-
|2006
|"Drop It Like It's Hot" (featuring Pharrell)
|rowspan="2"| Best Hip Hop Video
|
|-
|rowspan="2"|2007
|"That's That" (featuring R. Kelly)
|
|-
|"Buttons" (with The Pussycat Dolls)
| Best Hook-Up
|
|-
|}

MTV Europe Music Awards
The MTV Europe Music Awards were established in 1994 by MTV Europe to celebrate the most popular music videos in Europe. Snoop Dogg has won the award once from eight nominations.

|-
|rowspan="3"|2005
|rowspan="2"|Snoop Dogg
|Best Male Act
|
|-
|Best Hip Hop Act
|
|-
|"Signs"<small> (featuring Justin Timberlake)
|Best Song
|
|-
|2008
|"Sexual Eruption"
|Video Star
|
|-
|2010
|rowspan="4"|Snoop Dogg
|rowspan="2"|Best Hip Hop
|
|-
|rowspan="2"|2011
|
|-
|rowspan="2"|Best World Stage
|
|-
|2012
|
|-
|}

MTV Video Music Awards Japan 
The MTV Video Music Awards Japan were established in 2002 to celebrate the most popular music videos from Japanese and international artists. Snoop Dogg has been nominated three times.

|-
| style="text-align:center;" rowspan="3"|2011
| style="text-align:center;" rowspan="3"| "California Gurls" (with Katy Perry)
| Best Collaboration
| 
|-
| Best Pop Video
| 
|-
|Video of the Year
| 
|-

MuchMusic Video Awards
The MuchMusic Video Awards are annual awards presented by the Canadian music video channel MuchMusic to honor the year's best music videos. Snoop Dogg has been nominated twice.

|-
|2005
|"Drop It Like It's Hot" (featuring Pharrell)
|Best International Artist Video
|
|-
|2011
|"California Gurls" (with Katy Perry)
|Most Watched Video
|
|-
|}

O Music Awards
The "O Music Awards" (commonly abbreviated as the OMAs) is an awards show presented by Viacom to honor music, technology and intersection between the two. Snoop Dogg has been nominated once.

|-
| rowspan="4" style="text-align:center;"|2012
|-
|"Snoop Dogg"
| Most Extreme Fan Outreach 
|
|-
|}

Peoples Choice Awards
The Peoples Choice Awards is an annual award show from pop culture on Movie, Television, and Music. Snoop Dogg has received one nomination .

|-
|2012
|"Snoop Dogg"
|Favorite Hip-Hop Artist 
|
|-
|}

Primetime Emmy Awards
The Primetime Emmy Awards are bestowed by the Academy of Television Arts & Sciences (ATAS), in recognition of excellence in U.S. American primetime television programming. Snoop Dogg has received two nominations and one win.

|-
|2017
|Martha & Snoop's Potluck Dinner Party
|Outstanding Host for a Reality or Competition Program
|
|-
|2022
|The Pepsi Super Bowl LVI Halftime Show Starring Dr. Dre, Snoop Dogg, Mary J. Blige, Eminem, Kendrick Lamar And 50 Cent
|Outstanding Variety Special (Live)
|
|}

Radio Music Awards
The "Radio Music Awards" was an annual U.S. award show that honored the year's most successful songs on mainstream radio. Nominations were based on the amount of airplay recording artists receive on radio stations in various formats using chart information compiled by Mediabase. Snoop Dogg has been nominated once.

|-
|2005
|"Drop It Like It's Hot" (featuring Pharrell)
| Song of the Year/Urban and Rhythmic Radio
|
|}

Rolling Stone
The Rolling Stone is an American magazine published every two weeks and focused on music, liberal politics, and popular culture.

|-
| 1994
|"Snoop Dogg"
| Annual Critics Poll
| 
|-
|}

Soul Train Music Awards
The Soul Train Music Awards is an annual award show aired in national broadcast syndication that honors the best in African American music and entertainment established in 1987. Snoop Dogg has been nominated once.

|-
|1995
|Doggystyle
| Best Rap Album
|
|-
|2005
|"Drop It Like It's Hot" (featuring Pharrell)
| Best R&B/Soul or Rap Dance Cut
|
|}

Source Awards
The Source Awards is a United States-based, monthly full-color magazine covering hip-hop music, politics, and culture, founded in 1988. Snoop Dogg has won the award six times of 12 nominations.

|-
|rowspan="2"|1994
|rowspan="3"|"Snoop Dogg"
| New Artist of the Year (Solo)
|
|-
| Lyricist of the Year
|
|-
|rowspan="2"|1995
| Artist of the Year (Solo)
|
|-
|"Murder Was the Case"
| Video of the Year
|
|-
|1999
|rowspan="2"|"Snoop Dogg"
|rowspan="2"| Artist of the Year (Solo)
|
|-
|rowspan="3"|2000
|
|-
|"Tha Eastsidaz"
| New Artist of the Year
|
|-
|"Still D.R.E." (with Dr. Dre)
| Single of the Year
|
|-
|rowspan="4"|2001
|Tha Last Meal
| Album of the Year
|
|-
|rowspan="2"|"Snoop Dogg"
|Artist of the Year (Solo)
|
|-
|Live Performer of the Year
|
|-
|"Snoop Dogg (What's My Name Pt. 2)"
|Music Video of the Year
|
|-
|}

Stony Awards 
The High Times Stony Awards (a.k.a. the Stonys), sponsored by High Times magazine, celebrate the "highest and stoniest" movies and TV shows of the year. Snoop Dogg has won the award once.

|-
|2002
| "Snoop Dogg"
| Stoner of the Year
| 
|-
|}

Teen Choice Awards

Urban Fashion Awards
Snoop Dogg has won the award once.

|-
| 2002
|"Snoop Dogg Clothing"
| Best Celebrity Clothing Line
| 
|-
|}

Vibe Awards
Snoop Dogg has been nominated twice.

|-
|rowspan="3"|2003
|rowspan="3"|"Beautiful" (featuring Pharrell & Charlie Wilson)
| Coolest Collaboration
|
|-
| Hottest Hook
|
|-
| Reelest Video
|
|-
|2004
|"Drop It Like It's Hot" (featuring Pharrell)
| Hottest Hook
|
|-
|}

World Music Awards
The World Music Awards was an international awards show founded in 1989 that annually honored recording artists based on worldwide sales figures provided by the International Federation of the Phonographic Industry (IFPI).  Snoop Dogg has been nominated once.

|-
|rowspan="2"|2005
| Snoop Dogg
| Best-Selling Male R&B Award
|
|-
|}

WWE Hall of Fame
Snoop Dogg was announced as an inductee into the WWE Hall of Fame Class of 2016 on March 28, 2016.  He is a member of the Hall's "celebrity wing". He was inducted on April 2 by John Cena.

References 

Snoop Dogg
Awards and nominations